Spain was the host nation for the 1992 Summer Olympics in Barcelona. The Games were quite exceptional for Spain because their athletes were competing not only in their home country, but also in the home city of IOC President Juan Antonio Samaranch. 422 competitors, 297 men and 125 women, took part in 195 events in 29 sports.

Medalists

|  style="text-align:left; width:78%; vertical-align:top;"|

| width="22%" align="left" valign="top" |

Competitors
The following is the list of number of competitors in the Games.

Archery

The four Spaniards had little success in the individual round, with only one qualifying for the elimination matches.  He lost in the first round.  The men's team, however, surprised the world by pulling off four upsets to claim the gold medal—Spain's first archery medal—in front of a home crowd.

Men

Women

Athletics

Track & road events
Men

Women

Field events
Men

Women

Combined events – Men's decathlon

Badminton

Baseball

Men's team competition
Spain came within half an inning of losing all seven of its preliminary round games in the first official Olympic baseball tournament.  Trailing Puerto Rico 6-4 going into the bottom of the ninth, Spain rallied for three runs to win its only Olympic victory in the sport.

Preliminary round
Lost to United States (1:4)
Lost to Japan (1:12)
Lost to Dominican Republic (2:11)
Lost to Chinese Taipei (0:20)
Lost to Cuba (0:18)
Lost to Italy (1:14)
Defeated Puerto Rico (7:6) → 8th place

Men's Team Roster
 Antonio Salazar
 Enrique Cortés Pes
 Félix Manuel Cano
 Francisco Javier Aristu
 Gabriel Valarezo
 Javier Díez
 Jesús Lisarri
 José Arza
 José Luis Becerra
 José María Pulido
 Juan Ignacio Damborenea
 Juan Manuel Salmerón
 Juan Pedro Belza
 Luis Carlos León
 Manuel Martínez
 Miguel Ángel Pariente
 Miguel Stella
 Oscar Rebolleda
 Xavier Camps
 Xavier Civit

Basketball

Men's tournament

Team roster

Group play

Classification round, 9th to 12th place

9th place match

Women's tournament

Team roster

Group play

Classification round, 5th to 8th place

5th place match

Boxing

Canoeing

Slalom

Sprint

Cycling

Fourteen cyclists, eleven men and three women, represented Spain in 1992. José Moreno won gold in the 1 km time trial.

Road

Track
Sprint

Points race

Pursuit

Qualification Legend: Q = Qualify to quarterfinals Group A (medal); q = Qualify to quarterfinals Group B (non-medal)

Time trial

Diving

Equestrianism

Dressage

Eventing

Jumping

Fencing

17 fencers, 15 men and 2 women represented Spain in 1992.

Men

Women

Football

Summary

Team roster

Preliminary round (group C)
 Spain — Colombia 4-0 (3-0)
 Spain — Egypt 2-0 (0-0)
 Spain — Qatar 2-0 (1-0)
Quarterfinals
 Spain — Italy 1-0 (0-0)
Semifinals
 Spain — Ghana 2-0 (1-0)
Final
 Spain — Poland 3-2 (0-1) →  Gold Medal

Gymnastics

Artistic

Men

Women

Team

Individual finals

Rhythmic

Women

Synchronized swimming

Three synchronized swimmers represented Spain in 1992.

Women's solo
 Eva López
 Marta Amorós
 Nuria Ayala

Women's duet
 Eva López
 Marta Amorós

Table tennis

Tennis

Volleyball

Summary

Men's team competition
Preliminary round (group A)
 Defeated Canada (3-2)
 Lost to Italy (0-3)
 Lost to Unified States (2-3)
 Defeated Japan (3-2)
 Defeated France (3-2)
Quarterfinals
 Lost to Cuba (0-3)
Classification Matches
 5th/8th place: Lost to Italy (0-3)
 7th/8th place: Lost to Unified Team (2-3) → 8th place

Team roster
Ángel Alonso
Benjamín Vicedo
Francisco Hervás
Héctor López
Jesús Garrido
Jesús Sánchez
Juan Carlos Robles
Miguel Ángel Maroto
Rafael Pascual
Venancio Costa
Francisco Sánchez
Ernesto Rodríguez

Women's Team Competition
Preliminary round (group A)
 Lost to Unified Team (0-3)
 Lost to Japan (0-3)
 Lost to Unified States (0-3)
Classification Match
 7th/8th place: Lost to PR China (0-3) → 8th and last place

Team roster
Ana María Tostado
Asunción Domenech
Carmen Miranda
Estela Domínguez
Inmaculada González
Inmaculada Torres
Laura de la Torre
María del Mar Rey
Marta Gens
Olga Martín
Rita Oraá
Virginia Cardona
Head coach: Jaime Fernández Barros

Water polo

Men's tournament
Preliminary round (Group B)
 Spain — Netherlands 12-6
 Spain — Greece 11-6
 Spain — Hungary 8-5
 Spain — Italy 9-9
 Spain — Cuba 12-10
Semifinals
 Spain — United States 6-4
Final
 Spain — Italy 8-9 (→  Silver medal)

Team roster
 Daniel Ballart
 Jesús Rollán
 Jordi Sans
 Josep Picó
 Manuel Estiarte
 Manuel Silvestre
 Marco Antonio González
 Miguel Ángel Oca
 Pedro Francisco García
 Ricardo Sánchez
 Rubén Michavila
 Salvador Gómez
 Sergi Pedrerol

Weightlifting

Wrestling

References

External links
 Spanish Olympic Committee

Nations at the 1992 Summer Olympics
1992
Olympics